PASS ID is a proposed U.S. law intended to replace REAL ID. Like REAL ID, it implements federal standards for state identification documents. Currently, states are not obligated to follow the standards, but if PASS ID takes full effect, federal agencies will only accept identification from states that materially comply with the law. Citizens from non-compliant states would need to provide federally issued documents such as a social security card or U.S. passport in order to enter federally owned buildings.

PASS ID would eliminate REAL ID requirements that are considered excessive, such as the obligation to verify birth certificates with the issuing department, and shared national databases. However, critics charge PASS ID will still require the storage of digital records of documents proving citizenship, such as birth certificates. It may also permit technology like RFID to be incorporated into drivers' licenses.

Further reading

References

External links

Information privacy
Privacy law in the United States
Proposed legislation of the 111th United States Congress